The Grunewaldsee is a lake located in western Bezirk Charlottenburg-Wilmersdorf in Berlin within the Grunewald forest. It has a surface of c. 175,000 m2. The Jagdschloss Grunewald hunting lodge is located on the south bank of the lake.

Bathing has been officially prohibited for humans since 2004.

See also
 List of lakes of Germany

References

External links
 on the website of the city Berlin

Charlottenburg-Wilmersdorf
Lakes of Berlin
Berlin articles missing geocoordinate data